Xiangtang may refer to the following locations in China:

 Xiangtang, Hebei (响堂镇), town in Luan County
 Xiangtang, Jiangxi (向塘镇), town in Nanchang County
Xiangtang Railway Station (向塘站), on the Beijing–Kowloon Railway
Xiangtang West Railway Station (向塘西站), on the Beijing–Kowloon and Zhejiang–Jiangxi Railways
 Xiangtang Subdistrict (响堂街道), Haicheng, Liaoning